Naenam-myeon is a myeon or a township in the administrative subdivisions of the Gyeongju City, North Gyeongsang province, South Korea. It is bordered by Geumo Mountains on the east, Jusa Mountains on the south. Its 122.05 square kilometers are home to about  6,142 people. This population is served by one elementary school and one high school.

Administrative divisions
Nogok-ri (노곡리)
Deokcheon-ri (덕천리)
Mangseong-ri (망성리)
Myeonggye-ri (명계리)
Bakdal-ri (박달리)
Buji-ri (부지리)
Biji-ri (비지리)
Sangsin-ri (상신리)
Ansim-ri (안심리)
Yongjang-ri (용장리
Wolsan-ri (월산리)
Ijo-ri (이조리)
Hwagok-ri (화곡리)

See also
Subdivisions of Gyeongju
Administrative divisions of South Korea

References

External links
 The official site of the Naenam-myeon office

Subdivisions of Gyeongju
Towns and townships in North Gyeongsang Province